Huechys phaenicura is a species of cicada belonging to the family Cicadidae.

Distribution
This species is present in India, Philippines, Malaysia, Indonesia (Java).

References

Insects described in 1834
Cicadettini